Custóias is a former civil parish in the municipality of Matosinhos in the Greater Porto area, Portugal. In 2013, the parish merged into the new parish Custóias, Leça do Balio e Guifões. Custóias is a town since 2003.

Description
The area is mainly residential, with two-storey dwellings. The town centre is the town square, called Largo do Souto (Souto Square). Custóias hosts a large fair every Saturday.

Transportation
Custóias is served by A4 and VRI motorways. Sociedade de Transportes Colectivos do Porto and Resende provide the bus network. The Porto Metro are Line B and E - Custóias; Line C - Cândido dos Reis and Pias.

Penitentiary
Custóias is home to a state prison that serves the northern region of the country. It was built by prisoners in 1974.

References

External links
Website

Former parishes of Matosinhos